The 2019 season is Warriors' 24th consecutive season in the top flight of Singapore football and in the S.League. Along with the S.League, the club will also compete in the Prime League, the Singapore Cup and the Singapore League Cup.

Squad

S.League squad

U19 Squad

Coaching staff

Transfers

Pre-Season transfers

In

Note 1: Bryan Quek returned to the team after the loan and subsequently released.

Note 2: Fazli Shafie returned to the team after the loan and move to NFL club, Jungfrau Punggol FC. 

Note 3: Zuhaili Mazli returned to the team after the loan and subsequently released.

Note 4: Aniq Iskandar returned to the team after the loan and subsequently released.

Out

Extension

Promoted

Trial

Mid-Season Transfer

Out

Friendly

Pre-Season Friendly

Tour of Malaysia (9 to 18 January)

Team statistics

Appearances and goals

Note 1: Jonathan Behe scored an own goal in SPL match against Home United.

Competitions

Overview

Singapore Premier League

Singapore Cup

Semi-final

Warriors FC won 4-2 on penalty after 5-5 aggregate.

Final

See also 
 2017 Warriors FC season
 2018 Warriors FC season

References 

Warriors FC
Warriors FC seasons